The 2016 Ykkönen was the 45th season of Ykkönen, the second highest football league in Finland. The winning team qualified directly for promotion to the 2017 Veikkausliiga, while the second-placed team had to play a play-off against the eleventh-placed team from Veikkausliiga to decide who wod play in that division. The bottom two teams were relegated to Kakkonen.

Overview

A total of ten teams contested in the league, including six sides from the 2015 season, FF Jaro and KTP who was relegated from Veikkausliiga and GrIFK and KPV who promoted from Kakkonen after winning the promotion play-offs.

MP and VIFK were relegated from 2015 Ykkönen.

PS Kemi, the champion of 2015 Ykkönen and PK-35 Vantaa, the runner-up of 2015 Ykkönen were promoted to the 2016 Veikkausliiga.

Managerial changes

League table

Results

Matches 1–18

Matches 19–27

Statistics

Top scorers
Source: palloliitto.fi

See also
 2016 Veikkausliiga

References

External links
 Official site 

Ykkönen seasons
2
Fin
Fin